M.O.T.A. is the fourth studio album by the Puerto Rican reggae band, Cultura Profética. The album was recorded at Playbach Studios in San Juan, Puerto Rico, and released in 2005.

The title is a Spanish acronym for "Momentos de Ocio en el Templo del Ajusco" (Ajusco: a volcano in Mexico City) which means "Moments of Leisure in the Temple of Ajusco". This is a reference to the suburb of Mexico City where the band lived during a four-month tour in that country, which inspired them for the material in this album. "Mota" is also a slang term for "marijuana" in Mexican Spanish.

Track listing
All songs written by Eliut González, Willy Rodríguez, and Omar Silva, except where noted.
  - 5:49
  (González, Rodríguez) - 5:35
  (Rodríguez) - 5:22
  (Rodríguez, Yallzee) - 5:32
  (Bayrex Jiménez, Rodríguez, Silva) - 4:43
  (Rodríguez) - 4:20
  (Boris Bilbraut, Elizam Escobar, González, Jiménez, Rodríguez, Silva) - 5:20
  (Letra de Silvio Rodríguez, tema del album Descartes (1998)) - 5:59
  (Bilbraut, González, Jiménez, Rodríguez, Silva) - 1:22
  (González, Rodríguez) - 5:44
  (Rodríguez, Tek1) - 6:17
  - 6:04
  - 0:25
  - 4:08
  - 2:10
  - 4:51
  (González, Jiménez, Rodríguez) - 4:41

Musicians
 Willy Rodríguez - bass guitar, vocals
 Eliut González - guitar
 Omar Silva - guitar, bass guitar
 Boris Bilbraut - drums, vocals
 Bayrex Jiménez - piano, keyboards

Additional musicians
 Efraín Martínez - drums on Tracks 4, 9 and 11
 Alexandre Carlo (from Natiruts) - vocals in "La Noche Vibra"
 Guillermo Bonetto (from Los Cafres) - vocals in "Ritmo Que Pesa"
 Siete Nueve - vocals in "Canción Despojo"
 Tek1 - vocals in "Canción Despojo"
 DJ Nature - samples on Tracks 4, 7, 11 and 17
 Iván Gutiérrez - piano in "Yavida"
 Claudio Illiobre (from Los Cafres) - Moog in "Canción Despojo"

Production
 Produced by Willy Rodríguez, Eliut González, Omar Silva, Boris Bilbraut, Bayrex Jiménez

Recording
 Recorded at Playbach Studios in San Juan, Puerto Rico
 Mixed at EMG Studios in Kingston, Jamaica
 Mix engineers - Errol Brown and Shane Brown

2005 albums